The 1964 Kingston upon Thames Council election took place on 7 May 1964 to elect members of Kingston upon Thames London Borough Council in London, England. The whole council was up for election and the Conservative party gained control of the council.

Background
These elections were the first to the newly formed borough. Previously elections had taken place in the Municipal Borough of Kingston-upon-Thames, Municipal Borough of Malden and Coombe and Municipal Borough of Surbiton. These boroughs were joined to form the new London Borough of Kingston upon Thames by the London Government Act 1963.

A total of 172 candidates stood in the election for the 60 seats being contested across 24 wards. These included a full slate from the Conservative and Labour parties, while the Liberals stood 42 candidates. Other candidates included 9 Residents and 1 Communist.  There were 16 two-seat wards, 4 four-seat wards and 4 three-seat wards.

This election had aldermen as well as directly elected councillors.  The Conservatives got 9 aldermen and Labour 1.

The Council was elected in 1964 as a "shadow authority" but did not start operations until 1 April 1965.

Election result
The results saw the Conservatives gain the new council with a majority of 20 after winning 40 of the 60 seats. Overall turnout in the election was 43.0%. This turnout included 389 postal votes.

Ward results

References

1964
1964 London Borough council elections